Bernd Martin (10 February 1955, Stuttgart, West Germany – 1 December 2018) was a German footballer. He spent ten seasons in the Bundesliga with VfB Stuttgart and FC Bayern Munich and played one game (a UEFA Euro 1980 qualifier against Wales) for West Germany.

Honours
 Bundesliga champion: 1984–85
 Bundesliga runner-up: 1978–79
 DFB-Pokal winner: 1983–84
 DFB-Pokal finalist: 1984–85

References

External links
 

1955 births
2018 deaths
German footballers
Germany international footballers
Germany B international footballers
VfB Stuttgart players
FC Bayern Munich footballers
Bundesliga players
2. Bundesliga players
Association football defenders
Footballers from Stuttgart